Elena Dolores Furiase González (born 9 March 1988) is a Spanish actress.

Personal life 
Elena Dolores Furiase González was born on 9 March 1988 in Madrid. She is the daughter of Argentine producer, businessman and representative Guillermo Furiase and of Spanish singer and actress Lolita Flores. She has a younger brother named Guillermo Antonio Furiase González. She belongs to one of the best known sagas of artists in Spain, Los Flores.

On 19 March 2018, Furiase revealed that she and her partner, Gonzalo Sierra Martín-Garea, were expecting their first baby. On 12 October 2018, she gave birth to the couple's first child, a boy, who was born in Madrid. She married Gonzalo Sierra Martín-Garea on 18 September 2021 in the Dehesa de Monteenmedio in Vejer de la Frontera, Cádiz. On 4 July 2022, she gave birth to the couple's second child, a girl.

Career 
Elena played the role of Vicky in the famous series of Antena 3, El Internado for three years. During the filming she suffered a cervical sprain after a car accident. She won the Best Actress of the Year Awards Joven 2007 for this role.
In September 2008, premiered at the Teatro Amaya (Madrid), the second season of "Forget the Drums" by Ana Diosdado. In the play, directed by Victor Conde, Elena involved the role of Fury (Alicia).

On 14 November 2008 the El libro de las aguas, directed by Antonio Gimenez-Rico, debuted. It is based on the book of the same name by Alejandro Lopez Andrada, and Elena plays Amalia. In early 2009 she appeared in the video clip "La Lola". The song is dedicated to her grandmother, "La Faraona".

In May 2009, she was the spokesmodel of the footwear brand "Coolway". In August 2009, she participated in the film Bad People. In November 2009, she appeared on the cover of the Spanish edition of FHM magazine. In 2013, she joined the eighth season of Amar en tiempos revueltos.

Filmography

Theater

Television

Movies

Television programs

Video clips

References

External links 
 

Spanish film actresses
Actresses from Madrid
1988 births
Living people
Spanish people of Argentine descent